Carolyn Kaelin (born Carolyn Mary Scerbo; April 4, 1961 – July 28, 2015) was an American cancer surgeon. She worked at the Dana–Farber Cancer Institute and founded the  Comprehensive Breast Health Center at Brigham and Women’s Hospital in 1995.

Early life and education
Carolyn Kaelin was born in Syracuse, New York, to Mary (née Zebrowski) and Richard Scerbo. She was raised in Franklin Lakes, New Jersey, and graduated from Indian Hills High School in Oakland, New Jersey, in 1979. She studied biochemistry and economics at Smith College. She earned her medical degree from the Johns Hopkins School of Medicine. Kaelin also earned a master's degree from the Harvard T.H. Chan School of Public Health. During her residency, she earned an award for chief resident of the year.

Career
Carolyn Kaelin decided to specialize in breast surgery because it allowed her to know her patients well and provide long-term care unlike other surgical specialties. At the age of 34, Kaelin was appointed as a founding director of the Comprehensive Breast Health Center at Brigham and Women’s Hospital, a major Harvard teaching hospital. In 2001, she was selected as one of Newsweek's 15 Women of the New Century. Kaelin was diagnosed with breast cancer in July 2003. She underwent multiple operations, one of which caused her to lose sensation in her fingers, leading to the end of her surgical career.

Personal life
Carolyn Kaelin met her husband, William Kaelin Jr., while studying at the Johns Hopkins School of Medicine. They were married in 1988. Kaelin had two children, Kathryn and William (Tripp). Both are graduates of Yale University. Carolyn Kaelin was diagnosed with glioblastoma multiforme in 2010 and died of the tumor at her home in Charlestown, Massachusetts, on July 28, 2015, aged 54.

Bibliography
Living Through Breast Cancer (2005)
The Breast Cancer Survivor's Fitness Plan (2007)

References

1961 births
Smith College alumni
2015 deaths
Deaths from brain cancer in the United States
Deaths from cancer in Massachusetts
People from Syracuse, New York
People from Charlestown, Boston
People from Franklin Lakes, New Jersey
Physicians from New York (state)
American surgeons
Harvard School of Public Health alumni
Johns Hopkins School of Medicine alumni
Women surgeons